R136 (formerly known as RMC 136 from the Radcliffe Observatory Magellanic Clouds catalogue) is the central concentration of stars in the NGC 2070 star cluster, which lies at the centre of the Tarantula Nebula in the Large Magellanic Cloud.  When originally named it was an unresolved stellar object (catalogued as HD 38268 and Wolf-Rayet star Brey 82) but is now known to include 72 class O and Wolf–Rayet stars within 5 parsecs (20 arc seconds) of the centre of the cluster.  The extreme number and concentration of young massive stars in this part of the LMC qualifies it as a starburst region.

Properties
R136 produces most of the energy that makes the Tarantula Nebula visible. The estimated mass of the cluster is 450,000 solar masses, suggesting it may become a globular cluster in the future.  R136 has around 200 times the stellar density of a typical OB association such as Cygnus OB2.  The central R136 concentration of the cluster is about 2 parsecs across, although the whole NGC 2070 cluster is much larger.

R136 is thought to be less than 2 million years old.  None of the member stars is significantly evolved and none is thought to have exploded as supernova.  The brightest stars are WNh, O supergiants, and OIf/WN slash stars, all extremely massive fully convective stars.  There are no red supergiants, blue hypergiants, or luminous blue variables within the cluster.  A small number of class B stars have been detected in the outskirts of the cluster, but less massive and less luminous stars cannot be resolved from the dense cluster core at the large distance of the LMC.

R136a
R136a is the bright knot at the centre of R136.  It consists of eight extremely massive stars, three of them Wolf-Rayet stars and the rest early O-class stars.

Components
The cluster contains many of the most massive and luminous stars known, including R136a1.  Within the central 5 parsecs there are 32 of the hottest type O stars (O2.0–3.5), 40 other O stars, and 12 Wolf-Rayet stars, mostly of the extremely luminous WNh type.  Within 150 parsecs there are a further 325 O stars and 19 Wolf-Rayet stars.  Several runaway stars have been associated with R136, including VFTS 682.

R136 was first resolved into three components R136a, R136b, and R136c.  R136a was resolved using speckle interferometry and eventually space-based observations into as many as 24 components, dominated by R136a1, R136a2, and R136a3, all three being extremely massive WNh stars several million times more luminous than the sun.

Gallery

See also

 Hodge 301, an older massive star cluster in Tarantula Nebula.
 NGC 2060, a smaller open cluster near R136.

References

Further reading
 ESA Hubble, Symphony of colours in the Tarantula, 15 December 2004
 
 R 136 in the Aladin previewer

External links
 SIMBAD RMC 136
 NED RMC 136

Super star clusters
Open clusters
Tarantula Nebula
038268
?
Large Magellanic Cloud
Star-forming regions
Durchmusterung objects
Dorado (constellation)